Aleksandrs Vanags (21 March 1919 – 1986), also known as Alexandre Vanags, was a Latvian football and basketball player. At international level, he represented the Latvia national football team, after World War II he played football in France.

Biography
A midfielder, Vanags made his debut with Universitātes Sports before moving to ASK Rīga. He scored 9 goals for Latvia in 18 matches (from 1937 to 1939). In addition to football Vanags also played basketball for Latvia on an international level, he was silver medalist of EuroBasket 1939. In 1942 during German occupation of Latvia Vanags as a player with ASK won the Latvian league title.

After the Second World War Vanags settled in France where he joined RC Strasbourg. For two seasons he played also with FC Nancy but then returned to Strasbourg. In 140 matches with RC Strasbourg Vanags scored 10 goals. In 1951 Vanags won the Coupe de France with RC Strasbourg.

Later Vanags took up coaching football and basketball.

References

External links
 

1919 births
1986 deaths
Footballers from Riga
Association football midfielders
Ligue 1 players
RC Strasbourg Alsace players
FC Nancy players
Latvian footballers
Latvian men's basketball players
Latvia international footballers
Basketball players from Riga
Latvian expatriate basketball people in France
Latvian expatriate footballers
Expatriate footballers in France